Kassian may refer to:
 Kassian Cephas, first indigenous photographer from Indonesia
 Kassian method, Russian traditional therapy
 Kassianspitze, part of the Sarntal Alps mountain range in Italy
 Zack Kassian, Canadian ice hockey player
 Matt Kassian, Canadian ice hockey player
 Hindarx, Azerbaijan